Whitestone Point Light is located in Whitestone, Queens.

References

Lighthouses completed in 1889
Lighthouses in New York City
Transportation buildings and structures in Queens, New York
Whitestone, Queens
Government buildings in Queens, New York
1889 establishments in New York (state)